The Poljot Strela is a Russian hand-wound chronograph movement. Strela is Russian for "arrow".

Poljot produced the famous and popular "Schaltradchronographs" with the brands "Poljot", "Sekonda" and "Strela".

The price of an uncased chronograph-caliber 3133 is approximately EUR 35.00.

Models
 Poljot
 Okean - Watch used in the Russian space program. (Air-force?)
 Sekonda
 Sturmanskie
 Strela

Movements

3017
Introduced in 1959 the 3017 is a Russian clone of the Venus Model 70/150/152 column wheel chronograph movement.

 19/21 jewels
 18,000 bph
 two register, 45 minute

3133
In 1979 Poljot bought the closed production line equipment from Valjoux for their 7734 coulisse cam-lever chronograph movement.

 23 jewels
 21,600 bph
 two register, 30 minute

31679

 25 jewels
 21,600 bph
 moonphase

See also
 Poljot

References

External links
http://www.aviator-watch.com/html_general_infos/html_manuals/3133.htm

Watch models